RMIS Lomor (03) is a  operated by the Republic of Marshall Islands Sea Patrol.  Lomor is one of twenty-two small patrol vessels Australia designed and built for smaller fellow members of the Pacific Forum, after the United Nations Convention on the Law of the Sea extended control of a  exclusive economic zone for all maritime nations.

Operational history

In 2006 the Lomor worked with the Greenpeace ship Esperanza on fishery patrol.

In September 2012 Lomor, working with the Australian Defence Force, and the United States Coast Guard, to help locate a mariner lost in Marshall Island waters.

In February 2018 Lomor and  performed a joint patrol of their waters. In July Lomor engaged in joint exercises with the United States Coast Guard cutter Oliver F. Berry, a similar-sized vessel.

References 

Pacific Forum class patrol vessels
Naval ships of the Marshall Islands
1991 ships